Robert Wellington Dillabough (April 24, 1941 – March 27, 1997) was a Canadian professional ice hockey centre who played 283 games in the National Hockey League and 72 games in the World Hockey Association. Born in Belleville, Ontario he played for the Detroit Red Wings, California Golden Seals, Pittsburgh Penguins, Cleveland Crusaders, and Boston Bruins.

Career statistics

External links 

1941 births
1997 deaths
Baltimore Clippers players
Boston Bruins players
Canadian ice hockey centres
Cleveland Crusaders players
Detroit Red Wings players
Edmonton Flyers (WHL) players
Hamilton Red Wings (OHA) players
Hamilton Tiger Cubs players
Hershey Bears players
Ice hockey people from Ontario
Oakland Seals players
Pittsburgh Hornets players
Pittsburgh Penguins players
Rochester Americans players
Sportspeople from Belleville, Ontario